The Albanian water frog (Pelophylax shqipericus) is a species of true frog (family Ranidae) and is native to Albania and Montenegro.  As its common name suggests, it prefers aquatic environments.  The Albanian water frog is an endangered species and known populations are currently in decline.  Significant threats to its habitat are presented by pollution and by drainage of wetlands, and a more direct threat is the aggressive collection of the species for commercial purposes.

The frogs are medium-sized and males sometimes bear a distinctive bright green stripe down the length of the backbone.  Otherwise males are green to light brown in overall colouring with large black or dark brown spots.  Females are olive green or light brown in colour and also bear brown or black large spots.  As befits a species that prefers wetland habitats, the webbing on the feet extends to the tips of the toes.

Taxonomy
Pelophylax shqipericus was first described in 1987 under the name Rana shqiperica in the Proceedings of the Academy of Natural Sciences of Philadelphia.  The specific epithet shqipericus comes from Shqipëria, the Albanian word for Albania.  Many species that were once included in the genus Rana were moved to separate genera at the beginning of the 21st century, when detailed molecular phylogenetic data made a distinction among the species more clear.  P. shqipericus is one such species transferred from Rana to Pelophylax on the strength of the new DNA sequencing data.

Distribution and habitat
The Albanian water frog is endemic to the Balkans and primarily found only in western Albania and southern Montenegro, where it inhabits freshwater marshes, swamps, ditches, and the heavily vegetated shorelines of lakes and rivers.  The northernmost part of its range is Lake Skadar, where its presence is significantly threatened by over-collection.

Morphology
They bear large brown or black spots and sometimes also have a bright green vertebral stripe. The spots disappear or are much fainter during the breeding season, and dorsal colouration changes to olive or grass green. Their vocal sacs are only lightly pigmented, greyish or green. Females are larger with a mean size of about 74 mm, are light brown to olive green, and are also dorsally spotted. On the underside, yellow colouration is present around the groin, sometimes extending to the hind legs and the belly. The belly of females is usually cream and unspotted.

Like many water frogs, P. shqipericus has entirely webbed feet, with the webbing extending to the tips of the toes.

Both males and females utter a distress call that lasts several seconds.  The male advertising call does not have discrete pulse groups.

Conservation status
Populations in Albania and Montenegro are diminishing due to a variety of factors.  Fragmentation of its habitat is occurring as wetlands are drained for infrastructure and farming, and the quality of its remaining habitat is declining through pollution from agricultural and industrial run-off.  Although Lake Skadar is a protected site on both the Albanian and Montenegrin sides and recognised as an important wetland by the Ramsar Convention, there is still a significant amount of collection of amphibians that occurs at the lake for the pet trade and the food industry.  This practice reduces the population but also introduces fatal diseases, such as chytridiomycosis, and non-native frogs to the region.

Breeding and larval development of offspring rely on the aquatic nature of its habitat.  It is not known how well the Albanian water frog will adapt to the threats and changes in its environment.

References

External links
Albanian water frog (Pelophylax shqipericus), Arkive.org

Pelophylax
Amphibians of Europe
Amphibians described in 1987
Taxonomy articles created by Polbot